Tim Jerks  is an Australian football coach.

Jerks was active as coaching development manager at the New South Wales Institute of Sport, before he was appointed in May 2003 as the coach of the Tuvalu national football team. The 3–2 win against Kiribati was celebrated as a major achievement for Tuvaluan football as Kiribati is recognised as one of the leading teams in the competition.

In the years 2004/05 and 2007/08, Jerks was the chief coach of the Cook Islands national football team for the FIFA World Cup-qualification. In the 2007 South Pacific Games Cook Islands defeated Tuvalu 4–1.

In 2010, he was a coach of the Cook Islands, before being replaced from the New Zealander Shane Rufer.

References

External links
 Tuvalu
 Cook Islands

Australian soccer coaches
Australian expatriate soccer coaches
Living people
New South Wales Institute of Sport alumni
Expatriate football managers in Tuvalu
Tuvalu national football team managers
Expatriate football managers in the Cook Islands
Cook Islands national football team managers
Year of birth missing (living people)